Starowola  is a village in the administrative district of Gmina Jaświły, within Mońki County, Podlaskie Voivodeship, in north-eastern Poland.

According to the 1921 census, the village was inhabited by 28 people, among whom 22 were Roman Catholic, 5 Orthodox, and 1 Mosaic. At the same time, 22 inhabitants declared Polish nationality, 5 Belarusian and 1 Jewish.  There were 4 residential buildings in the village.

References

Starowola